The Little Traverse Light is located in Emmet County in the U.S. state of Michigan on the north side of the Little Traverse Bay of Lake Michigan on Harbor Point in West Traverse Township near Harbor Springs, Michigan.  It marks the entrance to the harbor at Harbor Springs.

History
In 1871, Orlando M. Poe recommended the construction of this light.  However, a paucity of funds delayed the United States Congress in acting on the request.

The site was purchased in 1883, and the United States Lighthouse Service built the light in 1884.

The decagonal lantern room is painted white and has a red roof.  The fourth order Fresnel lens was manufactured in Paris by L. Sautter, Lemonnie & Co. in 1881.

A "very rare" fog bell square pyramidal tower was built in 1896 in front of the tower. The structure and the striking mechanism are still in place.  Other structures included a brick paint locker, summer kitchen, wooden boat storage shed, and auto garage

The lighthouse was manned by personnel until 1963 when a modern replacement light and tower was constructed, consisting of a white steel skeleton on a foundation of concrete. It is located on the point east of the lighthouse.

It is very difficult to visit the lighthouse as it is located on private property and unless you own a house in the gated community or are a guest. The lighthouse is not available to the public and people are not allowed inside. There is checkpoint that is manned 24 hours a day at the entrance.

This unique lighthouse has been the subject of paintings.

Elizabeth Whitney Williams was one of the first female lighthouse keepers to serve on the Great Lakes, and wrote a memoir that included her experiences at this light.

See also
Lighthouses in the United States

Notes

Further reading

 Bibliography on Michigan lighthouses.
 Clifford, Mary Louise & Clifford, J. Candace, Women Who Kept the Lights: An Illustrated History of Female Lighthouse Keepers, Michigan History Magazine (November/December 1981).
 Crompton, Samuel Willard  & Michael J. Rhein, The Ultimate Book of Lighthouses (2002) ; .
 Hyde, Charles K., and Ann and John Mahan. The Northern Lights: Lighthouses of the Upper Great Lakes.  Detroit: Wayne State University Press, 1995.    .
 Jones, Ray & Bruce Roberts, American Lighthouses (Globe Pequot, September 1, 1998, 1st Ed.) ; .
 Jones, Ray,The Lighthouse Encyclopedia, The Definitive Reference (Globe Pequot, January 1, 2004, 1st ed.) ; .
 Noble, Dennis, Lighthouses & Keepers: U. S. Lighthouse Service and Its Legacy (Annapolis: U. S. Naval Institute Press, 1997). ; .
 Oleszewski, Wes, Great Lakes Lighthouses, American and Canadian: A Comprehensive Directory/Guide to Great Lakes Lighthouses, (Gwinn, Michigan: Avery Color Studios, Inc., 1998) .
 Penrod, John, Lighthouses of Michigan, (Berrien Center, Michigan: Penrod/Hiawatha, 1998)  .
 Penrose, Laurie and Bill, A Traveler’s Guide to 116 Michigan Lighthouses (Petoskey, Michigan: Friede Publications, 1999).   
 
 Putnam, George R., Lighthouses and Lightships of the United States, (Boston: Houghton Mifflin Co., 1933).
 United States Coast Guard, Aids to Navigation, (Washington, DC: U. S. Government Printing Office, 1945).
 
 
 Wagner, John L., Michigan Lighthouses: An Aerial Photographic Perspective, (East Lansing, Michigan: John L. Wagner, 1998)  .
 Wargin, Ed, Legends of Light: A Michigan Lighthouse Portfolio (Ann Arbor Media Group, 2006).  .
Williams, Elizabeth Whitney Van Riper, A Child of the Sea; and Life Among the Mormons.
 Wright, Larry and Wright, Patricia, Great Lakes Lighthouses Encyclopedia Hardback (Erin: Boston Mills Press, 2006) .

External links

 Aerial photos, Little Traverse Light, marinas.com.
 Detroit News, Interactive map on Michigan lighthouses.
 Interactive map of Lights in Northern Lake Michigan, mapped by Google.

Lighthouses completed in 1884
Lighthouses completed in 1963
Lighthouses in Michigan
Buildings and structures in Emmet County, Michigan
Transportation in Emmet County, Michigan